Silver City Raiders is a 1943 American Western film directed by William Berke and written by Ed Earl Repp. The film stars Russell Hayden, Dub Taylor, Bob Wills, Alma Carroll, Paul Sutton and Jack Ingram. The film was released on November 4, 1943, by Columbia Pictures.

Plot

Cast          
Russell Hayden as Lucky Harlan
Dub Taylor as Cannonball
Bob Wills as Bob Halliday
Alma Carroll as Dolores Alvarez
Paul Sutton as Bart Dawson
Jack Ingram as Dirk
Edmund Cobb as Ringo
Art Mix as Slim

References

External links
 

1943 films
1940s English-language films
American Western (genre) films
1943 Western (genre) films
Columbia Pictures films
Films directed by William A. Berke
American black-and-white films
1940s American films